Ashraf Ali Khan Khasru is a Bangladesh Awami League politician. He is the incumbent State Minister of Social Welfare serving since February 2020 and former State Minister of Fisheries and Livestock from January 2019. He is the incumbent Jatiya Sangsad member from Netrokona-2 constituency.

References

Living people
Awami League politicians
9th Jatiya Sangsad members
11th Jatiya Sangsad members
State Ministers of Fisheries and Livestock
State Ministers of Social Welfare
Place of birth missing (living people)
Date of birth missing (living people)
Year of birth missing (living people)